Nancy Margaret Gillespie (born 10 March 1948) is a Western Australian resident and author.

Life
She was born in Taihape, New Zealand, and moved to the Pilbara in the 1970s.

She wrote the original Red Dog book, titled Red Dog.
This book is no longer in print (1983 version), however a new edition of the book is to be released September 2011. She currently writes short stories and has a large collection unpublished.

Works
Red Dog, Ilfracombe, Devon: Arthur H. Stockwell Limited, 1983,

References

External links
 2011 reprint and author contact

1948 births
Living people
People from the Pilbara
Australian women short story writers
People from Taihape